Women Who Fall by the Wayside is a 1925 German silent drama film directed by Géza von Bolváry and starring Ellen Kürti, Olaf Fjord, and Carl Walther Meyer.

It was made by Bavaria Film at the company's Emelka Studios in Munich. The film's sets were designed by the art directors Peter Rochelsberg and Otto Völckers.

Cast

References

Bibliography

External links

1925 films
Films of the Weimar Republic
German silent feature films
German drama films
Films directed by Géza von Bolváry
1925 drama films
Films about prostitution in Germany
German black-and-white films
Bavaria Film films
Films shot at Bavaria Studios
Silent drama films
1920s German films